The Diocese of Loreto was a Roman Catholic diocese with see in Loreto, Italy.

History 
The diocese was established by Pope Sixtus V in the Bull Pro excellenti of 17 March 1586. It was merged with the Diocese of Recanati to form the Diocese of Recanati e Loreto in either 1591 or 1592.

Bishops

Diocese of Loreto
Erected: 17 March 1586
Latin Name: Dioecesis ab Alma Domo Lauretana

Francesco Cantucci (23 Mar 1586 - 26 Nov 1586 Died)
Rutilio Benzoni (16 Dec 1586 - 9 Feb 1592 Appointed, Bishop of Recanati e Loreto)

9 February 1592: United with the Diocese of Recanati to form the Diocese of Recanati e Loreto

See also
Roman Catholic Diocese of Recanati

References

Bibliography

External links 
 GCatholic.org

Former Roman Catholic dioceses in Italy
Religious organizations established in 1586
Roman Catholic dioceses established in the 16th century